Archbishop Rummel may refer to: 

 Joseph Rummel (1876–1964), Roman Catholic archbishop
 Archbishop Rummel High School, Roman Catholic secondary school Metairie, Louisiana